James Ronald McDaniels (April 2, 1948 – September 6, 2017) was an American professional basketball player. McDaniels played collegiately for Western Kentucky University and was the No. 1 overall pick in the 1971 American Basketball Association Draft. McDaniels was an ABA All-Star.

High School & College career

A 6'11" power forward/center, McDaniels averaged nearly 40 points per game as a senior at Allen County High School in Scottsville, Kentucky. From 1967 to 1971, he played at Western Kentucky University, leading his team to a third-place finish in the 1971 NCAA Men's Division I Basketball Tournament. (The NCAA later voided Western Kentucky's participation in the tournament, accusing McDaniels of signing with an agent while still in college.) He also set WKU school records with 2,238 career points (now tied with Courtney Lee) and 1,118 career rebounds.

Professional career

McDaniels was drafted by the Seattle SuperSonics in the second round of the 1971 NBA draft and No. 1 overall by the Dallas Chaparrals in the 1971 American Basketball Association Draft, but he began his professional career with the Carolina Cougars of the American Basketball Association, who offered him a $1.35 million contract to be paid over 25 years. Reportedly, the Cougars first approached McDaniels during November 1970, while he was still playing for Western Kentucky. McDaniels averaged 26.8 points and 14 rebounds in 58 games with the Cougars during the 1971–72 season and scored 24 points and grabbed 11 rebounds in the 1972 ABA All-Star Game. However, he feuded with the Cougars while trying to renegotiate his contract – he wanted his salary to be spread over 15 years, rather than 25 – and near the end of his rookie season he decided to leave the Cougars for the SuperSonics.

McDaniels remained with Seattle for the next two full seasons. However, he struggled to maintain the same level of production he had achieved in the ABA, and by the 1973–74 NBA season, McDaniels was averaging just 5.5 points per game. During that time, McDaniels was dogged by off-court troubles as the Cougars questioned the legality of his jump to the NBA. He later admitted in an interview, "I should have stayed in the ABA for a couple of years. I was just young and things started going bad for me there and I didn't know how to handle them." SuperSonics coach and general manager Bill Russell ultimately released McDaniels in fall 1974.

For the next four years, McDaniels bounced from team to team, playing for the Los Angeles Lakers and Buffalo Braves of the NBA, the Kentucky Colonels of the ABA, and Snaidero Udine of Italy. He finally decided to retire from basketball in 1978.

Personal life
McDaniels had two sons (Eskias McDaniels, Shannon Martin).

McDaniels died in Bowling Green, Kentucky at the age of 69, due to complications from diabetes.

Cultural relevance
The 1971 Western Kentucky Hilltoppers basketball team was the first non-historically black, Kentucky collegiate basketball team to start five African-American players. Coach John Oldham started McDaniels,  Jim Rose, Clarence Glover, Jerry Dunn and Rex Bailey. McDaniels had helped recruit Rose and the others after signing at WKU. Oldham was pressured not to start all five together, but said "they are my best five players."

Honors
McDaniels' #44 jersey was retired by Western Kentucky in January 2000.

See also
List of NCAA Division I men's basketball players with 2000 points and 1000 rebounds

References

1948 births
2017 deaths
African-American basketball players
All-American college men's basketball players
American expatriate basketball people in Italy
American men's basketball players
Basketball players from Kentucky
Buffalo Braves players
Carolina Cougars players
Centers (basketball)
Deaths from diabetes
Kentucky Colonels players
Los Angeles Lakers players
Parade High School All-Americans (boys' basketball)
People from Scottsville, Kentucky
Power forwards (basketball)
Seattle SuperSonics draft picks
Seattle SuperSonics players
Utah Stars draft picks
Western Kentucky Hilltoppers basketball players
20th-century African-American sportspeople
21st-century African-American people